The A 5120 was an office computer produced by VEB Robotron in Karl-Marx-Stadt (now Chemnitz), East Germany starting in 1982.  The system featured an 8-bit microprocessor, the U880.  It was built for office work and had minimal graphics and sound capabilities. The price was between 27,000 and 40,000 East German marks (around 24,000-35,000 2016 US dollars) depending on equipment.  

In 1986, a new version was produced, the A 5120.16. The system was identical to the A 5120, with the addition of two additional boards, one with a U8000 16-bit microprocessor (a Zilog Z8000 clone), and one with 256KiB DRAM. The original 8-bit system functioned as an I/O subsystem. In this configuration it could run the relatively powerful MUTOS8000 (Unix System III derivative). The price of this model was between about 32,000 and 48,000 East German marks. 

In total, about 17,000 A 5120 and A 5120.16 units were manufactured. 

In March 1983, a stamp was issued by the German Democratic Republic featuring the A 5120. 4.5 million copies were printed. 

An A 5120 was featured in the 2015 television show Deutschland 83 as an example of technological disparity between East and West Germany in the early 1980s.

Technical details 
The original A 5120 had two U880 (Zilog Z80 clone) 8-bit processors, running at 2.25MHz or 2.5MHz. One was dedicated to I/O, while the other was used for normal work. Each was capable of about 625,000 operations per second. It normally came with 16KiB of RAM, but a few units shipped with less. When higher-capacity DRAM chips became available, most units shipped with at least 64KiB, and some with as much as 112KiB.

The A 5120.16 upgrade included two new circuit boards, one with a 16-bit U8001 processor (clone of Zilog Z8000), and the other with 256KiB of additional RAM. The original 8-bit system functioned as a terminal to the 16-bit system.

For storage, the first A 5120 units had dual magnetic cassette drives, but when the floppy disk version became available, all of these units were converted. The first floppy disk version of the machine included an 8-inch floppy disk drive, with two additional 8-inch drives available in a separate unit. Later, the A 5120 included up to three 5.25-inch drives in place of the 8-inch drive.

Images

In Popular Culture 
It is featured in DEUTSCHLAND 83 SEASON 1 Episode 03 as showcase
of difference in technology between East Germany and West Germany.

See also 
 History of computer hardware in Eastern Bloc countries
 Robotron KC 87, a home computer with similar core hardware introduced in 1987

References 

Products introduced in 1982
Goods manufactured in East Germany
Science and technology in East Germany